Aleksandr Nikolaevich Naumov (1868 in Simbirsk – 1950 in Nice) was a politician.

Life 
Naumov, a graduate of Moscow University, was a land captain in Samara Governorate from 1893 to 1897, a member of the Zemstvo Assembly of Stavropol Uezd in Samara Governorate from 1894 to 1897, and, from 1897 to 1902, the Chairman of the Zemstvo Board of Samara Governorate.  The Tsar bestowed on him the title of Marshal of Nobility of Stavropol Uezd in 1902, and of Samara in 1905. Naumov was the publisher of the periodical Golos Samary; he was elected a member of the Russian State Council in 1909, 1912, and 1915 and again in 1916.  He served as the Russian Minister of Agriculture during 1915 and 1916, then fled in the wake of the October Revolution.

References 
 V.I. Gurko. Features And Figures Of The Past. Government And Opinion In The Reign Of Nicholas II.

1868 births
1950 deaths
Moscow State University alumni
Newspaper publishers (people) from the Russian Empire
Marshals of nobility
Members of the State Council (Russian Empire)
Government ministers of the Russian Empire
Memoirists from the Russian Empire
Nobility from the Russian Empire
White Russian emigrants to France